Dream Factory is an Indian film distribution company based in Chennai. The company was founded in 2014 by six film producers. They have released and distributed films across several regional film industries in India.

History
In July 2014, Dream Factory was formed as a new film distribution and marketing company by six leading producers in the Tamil film industry - K. E. Gnanavelraja of Studio Green, C. V. Kumar of Thirukumaran Entertainment, Elred Kumar of RS Infotainment, S. Sashikanth of YNOT Studios, Abinesh Elangovan of Abi & Abi Pictures and Laxmanan of Prince Pictures. At the launch, the shareholders of the company noted there would be a "scientific approach to better monetise films released across Tamil Nadu" and an overall aim to have "seamless integration between the three arms – production, marketing and distribution of content".

The firm's first release was Sarabham, produced by C. V. Kumar's Thirukumaran Entertainment and Abinesh's Abi & Abi Pictures, during August 2014. Since Sarabham, the team have over seen the release of several films and have worked as distributors to "new-gen" film projects.

Filmography

Distribution
The following films are a list of film which were distributed by Dream Factory throughout Tamil Nadu:
Sarabham (2014)
Madras (2014)
Yaan (2014)
Kaaviya Thalaivan (2014)
Darling (2015)
Dharani (2015)
Enakkul Oruvan (2015)
Serndhu Polama (2015)
Komban (2015)
Thunai Mudhalvar (2015)
Massu Engira Masilamani (2015)
36 Vayadhinile (2015)
Moondraam Ullaga Por (2016)
Uchathula Shiva (2016)
Kadalai (2016)
 Dhuruvangal Pathinaaru (2016)

References

Film distributors of India
Indian companies established in 2014
Film production companies based in Chennai
Indian film studios
2014 establishments in Tamil Nadu